Elettra-Ingrid Rossellini Wiedemann (born July 26, 1983) is an American food editor, writer, fashion model, and socialite. She is the daughter of Italian actress and model Isabella Rossellini and Jonathan Wiedemann, an American. Her maternal grandparents were Swedish actress Ingrid Bergman and Italian film director Roberto Rossellini.

Early life
Wiedemann was born and raised in New York City. She has three half siblings from her father's second marriage. She also has a brother on her mother's side. She attended high school at the United Nations International School, where she became fluent in French. Growing up, Wiedemann suffered from scoliosis, a spinal condition that had also afflicted her mother, and had to wear a back brace 23 hours a day from the ages of 12 to 17.

She attended college at The New School, graduating with a Bachelor of Arts in International Relations. She attended a two-year graduate school program at the London School of Economics in order to receive a master's degree in Biomedicine, Bioscience and Society.

Career
Wiedemann worked as a fashion model and spokesperson for over 10 years before Impatient Foodie. She was discovered by Bruce Weber and quickly became one of the industry's most coveted models, shooting with photographers such as Karl Lagerfeld, Patrick Demarchelier, Annie Leibovitz, Arthur Elgort, Mario Testino, and Craig McDean for magazines such as American Vogue, French Vogue, Harpers Bazaar, Another, Muse, GQ, French Elle and Italian Elle, to name a few. She has also been a spokesmodel for Lancôme since 2004 and done ads for Lancôme makeup, fragrance, and skin care worldwide.

While she was modeling, Wiedemann attended graduate school at the London School of Economics (LSE), ultimately receiving her Masters of Science (MSc) in Biomedicine, Biosciences and Society in 2010.  Her MSc dissertation was an analysis of a biotech proposal known as Vertical Farming and the future of feeding urban populations in light of climate change. At the time, her dissertation was the first ever cross-disciplinary analysis of Vertical Farming, for which she received the top possible mark of a Distinction.

Upon graduation from the LSE, Wiedemann launched a pop-up restaurant, GOODNESS. GOODNESS featured a different chef and different menu every day. GOODNESS popped up twice at NY Fashion Week and at Iceland's Design March Festival before turning into a show (Elettra's Goodness) on Vogue's new channel. Guests included Blake Lively, Seth Meyers, Grace Coddington, and Karlie Kloss.

She has also written for publications including Refinery29, VICE Munchies, Teen Vogue, SELF, Paper Magazine, The Cut, and Cherry Bombe.

Personal life
Wiedemann was married to restaurateur James Marshall from 2012 to 2015. She has two sons, Ronin Hendrick Lane (born January 2, 2018) and Viggo River Lane (born June 14, 2021), with actor Caleb Lane.

She raced in several triathlons and three Half Ironman races. For her last race (Ironman 70.3 in Lake Stevens), she renounced energy gels and baked all of her own bite-sized food for racing fuel, and is convinced it helped her achieve her fastest 70.3 time.

Wiedemann has a younger brother Roberto who also became a model.

She has an older cousin Tommaso who made two films, Interno Giorno (2011) and Playing with Plays (2019).

References

External links
 
 
 
 Announced as new Lancome spokesmodel
 Vanity Fair: Eco-Chic Becomes Elettra
 Theodora & Callum Interview with Elettra Wiedemann

1983 births
Living people
American female models
American people of German descent
American people of Italian descent
American people of French descent
American people of Swedish descent
Writers from Manhattan
The New School alumni
United Nations International School alumni
21st-century American women
Elettra